Cora Susan Collins (born April 19, 1927) is an American former child actress who appeared in numerous films during the Golden Years of Hollywood.

Early life and career
Cora Susan Collins was born on April 19, 1927, in Beckley, West Virginia. She later moved to Los Angeles, California, along with her mother and older sister. Collins made her acting debut in The Unexpected Father in 1932 at the age of five. Her reported salary in 1934 was $250 per week.

Throughout the 1930s and 1940s, Collins appeared in numerous films including Queen Christina, Anna Karenina, and All This, and Heaven Too. She was often cast as the daughter of the main characters, or as the leading lady in her childhood. She was initially cast as Becky Thatcher in The Adventures of Tom Sawyer (1938), but her role was changed to Amy Lawrence because Collins was considered to be too tall for Tommy Kelly. She said that writer Harry Ruskin, 33 years her senior, tried to force her to have sex with him in exchange for a good role at age 15. She refused and told Louis B. Mayer about what had happened, who was nonchalant and dismissive about it. One of her rare leading roles was in the 1945 drama film Youth on Trial, in which she played the juvenile delinquent daughter of a court judge. Her last movie appearance was in 1945, after which she retired from show business at the age of 18.

Personal life
Around 1944, Collins married Ivan Stauffer, a wealthy rancher from Nevada. In 1960, robbers stole two mink coats from her home while she was on vacation. Around 1961, she married James Morgan Cox. In a 1996 article, Collins was referred to as Susie Nace and lived in Phoenix, Arizona. Her husband at the time was theatre owner Harry Nace, who died in June 2002 at the age of 87. Having appeared with Greta Garbo in two films, Collins and Garbo remained in contact until Garbo's death in 1990.

Filmography

References

Further reading
 Dye, David (1988). Child and Youth Actors: Filmography of Their Entire Careers, 1914-1985. Jefferson, NC: McFarland & Co., p. 35.
 Best, Marc (1971). Those Endearing Young Charms: Child Performers of the Screen. South Brunswick and New York: Barnes & Co., p. 35-39.
 Willson, Dixie (1935). Little Hollywood Stars. Akron, OH, and New York: Saalfield Pub. Co.

External links

 
 
 
 

1927 births
Living people
American child actresses
People from Beckley, West Virginia
Actresses from West Virginia
20th-century American actresses
American film actresses
21st-century American women